The Hotel Imperial, also known as The Imperial, is a five-star luxury hotel in Vienna, Austria. It is located on the Vienna Ring Road (Ringstraße) at Kärntner Ring 16, in the Innere Stadt district.

Description
The Hotel Imperial's façade is in the Italian Neo-Renaissance style. The top of the building contains a stone balustrade that frames heraldic animals from the Württemberg coat of arms. The main entrance portal contains four statues that are also symbolic. The original portal was wide enough for a two-horse-drawn carriage.

The hotel's interior furnishings highlight the nineteenth-century Viennese elegance with ornate marble, hand-carved statues, and massive crystal chandeliers. In the lobby, the Royal Staircase leads up to suites and rooms that are also illuminated by magnificent chandeliers hanging from the high stucco ceilings. The hotel's private balconies offer views of the Altstadt skyline.

History
The building was designed by architect Arnold Zenetti and built under the direction of Heinrich Adam in 1863. Initially, it was planned as the city palace (Stadtpalais) and residence of Duke Philipp of Württemberg (1838–1917) and his wife Maria Theresa (1845–1927), née Archduchess of Austria; its original name was Palais Württemberg. However, the ducal couple did not enjoy their new home for long. After moving there in 1866, they sold it five years later.

For the 1873 Vienna World's Fair, the palace was converted into a hotel. In 1928, two storeys were added, but the original architecture is still very much in evidence and is an integral part of the luxurious atmosphere.

Over the years, the Hotel Imperial has had numerous famous guests, including Queen Elizabeth II and Charlie Chaplin. Dignitaries and royalty from around the world have stayed at the Imperial. Adolf Hitler, who worked at the hotel as a day laborer during his youthful period as a virtual tramp in Vienna, returned following the 1938 Anschluss as an honored guest, and had a permanent suite.

The Imperial was acquired by Compagnia Italiana Grandi Alberghi (CIGA) after Swiss-born Prince Karim Aga Khan acquired the company in 1985 and began expanding its presence (which was purely Italian up to that time) into Spain and Austria. In 1994, Starwood acquired CIGA and merged it into The Luxury Collection, an assemblage of historic and venerable hotels that have similar grandeur as the Imperial.

Before the war, the Imperial had partly been owned by Samuel Schallinger, who was forced to sell it in 1938 due to the Nazi persecution of Jews. Schallinger died in 1942 at the Theresienstadt concentration camp near Prague. Simon Wiesenthal, a Jewish Austrian survivor of the Nazi death camps who dedicated his life to documenting the crimes of the Holocaust, celebrated his 90th birthday at the Hotel Imperial in 1998 with a kosher dinner party. “Look, even the chandeliers are shaking,” said Wiesenthal at the dinner. “Hitler is gone. The Nazis are no more. But we are still here, singing and dancing.”

Today, the Hotel Imperial is, perhaps, Vienna's most exclusive five-star hotel. Guests of state typically stay at the hotel, such as the Emperor and Empress of Japan on their visit in 2002.

Imperial Torte

A speciality of the hotel is the Imperial cake, known as the Imperial Torte, which is a marzipan and chocolate torte. It is based on a recipe that is said to have been created by an apprentice cook who fashioned it when Emperor Franz Joseph opened the hotel in 1873. The confection comes in either a plain pinewood box or a cardboard box (for shipments), each containing a single torte or a group of small tortes.

References

 Andreas Augustin. The Most Famous Hotels in the World: Hotel Imperial Vienna. 1999.

External links

 Hotel Imperial - official website
 Cafe Imperial Wien at Hotel Imperial
 Vienna's tourist trail of plunder, Guardian (World News), 21 May 2002.

Hotels in Vienna
Palaces in Vienna
State guesthouses
Purveyors to the Imperial and Royal Court
The Luxury Collection
Hotels established in 1873
Buildings and structures in Innere Stadt
Hotel buildings completed in 1863